Barbara Maria Patoleta is a Polish arachnologist who specialises in the taxonomy, evolution and zoogeography of jumping spiders (family Salticidae) in the Pacific Islands.

Education
Patoleta studied biology and chemistry at high school before studying biology at the Faculty of Agriculture at Siedlce University of Natural Sciences and Humanities between 1988 and 1993. She obtained her master's degree in the Department of Anatomy and Vertebrate Morphology in 1993, and subsequently her doctorate in 2002.

Taxa described
As of April 2017, the World Spider Catalog lists the following taxa described by Patoleta:
Cytaea taveuniensis Patoleta & Gardzińska, 2010
Lagnus monteithorum Patoleta, 2008
Phintella caledoniensis Patoleta, 2009
Pristobaeus taveuniensis (Patoleta, 2008)
Pristobaeus vanuaensis (Patoleta, 2008)
Pristobaeus vitiensis (Patoleta, 2008)
Proszynellus nasalis Patoleta & Żabka, 2015
Proszynellus occidentalis Patoleta & Żabka, 2015
Proszynellus wandae Patoleta & Żabka, 2015
Rhondes atypicus Patoleta, 2016
Rhondes berlandi Patoleta, 2016
Rhondes flexibilis Patoleta, 2016
Rhondes sarasini Patoleta, 2016
Rhondes zofiae Patoleta, 2016
Trite caledoniensis Patoleta, 2014
Trite guilberti Patoleta, 2014
Trite simoni Patoleta, 2014
Xenocytaea stanislawi Patoleta, 2011
Xenocytaea taveuniensis Patoleta, 2011
Xenocytaea victoriensis Patoleta, 2011
Xenocytaea vonavonensis Patoleta, 2011

References

External links
 Barbara M. Patoleta, Wikispecies

Polish arachnologists
Living people
21st-century Polish zoologists
Women zoologists
21st-century Polish women scientists
Year of birth missing (living people)
20th-century Polish women scientists